Kumotori may refer to:

Mount Kumotori, a mountain at the boundary of Tokyo, Saitama, and Yamanashi Prefectures, Japan
11133 Kumotori, a main-belt asteroid